The 1977 NCAA Division I Wrestling Championships were the 47th NCAA Division I Wrestling Championships to be held. The University of Oklahoma in Norman, Oklahoma hosted the tournament at McCasland Field House.

Iowa State took home the team championship with 95.5 points and one individual champion. 

Nick Gallo of Hofstra was named the Most Outstanding Wrestler and Johnnie Jones of Iowa State received the Gorriaran Award.

Team results

Individual finals

References
1977 NCAA Tournament Results

NCAA Division I Wrestling Championship
NCAA
Wrestling competitions in the United States
NCAA Division I  Wrestling Championships
NCAA Division I  Wrestling Championships
NCAA Division I  Wrestling Championships